Enderamulla is a small village with a relatively large population situated in the Gampaha District, Western Province, Sri Lanka. The closest urban settlement to Enderamulla is Kadawatha, which is situated on the (A1) Colombo-Kandy Road. St. Sebastian's Church, Enderamulla is one of the main attractions in Enderamulla.

Landmarks and notable places

St. Sebastian's Church
St. Sebastian's Maha Vidyalaya
Enderamulla railway station
St. Joseph's College, Wattala
 Masjidul Firdous Jumma Mosque
 Tankiyawatta Playground

References

Populated places in Western Province, Sri Lanka